Hooked on Classics 3: Journey Through the Classics is an album by Louis Clark and the Royal Philharmonic Orchestra, published in 1983 by K-tel as part of the Hooked on Classics series.

Track listing 

 Also Sprach Zarathustra - 1:11

 Also Sprach Zarathustra, Op. 30, I: Prelude (Sunrise) / Richard Strauss

 Journey Through The Classics - 3:50

 Faust, Act 5, Ballet Music / Gounod
 A Midsummer Night's Dream, Op. 61, XI: Dance of the Clowns / Mendelssohn
 Horn Concerto No. 3 In E♭ Major, K. 447, III: Rondo: Allegro Vivace / Mozart
 Symphony No. 7 in A Major, Op. 92, III: Presto /  Beethoven 
 Concerto In D Major, Op. 7, No. 1 / Albinoni
 Trumpet Tune / Purcell
 Samson And Delilah, Op. 47, Act 3, Bacchanale / Saint-Saëns
 Finlandia, Op. 26 / Sibelius

 Hooked On Haydn - 2:52

 Trumpet Concerto In E♭ Major, Hob.: VIIe/1, III: Allegro (3rd Movement)

 Hooked On Romance (Opus 3) - 4:17

 Gymnopédie No. 1 / Satie
 Nocturne in E♭ Major, Op. 9, No. 2 / Chopin
 String Quartet No. 2 in D Major, III: Notturno / Borodin
 Recuerdos De La Alhambra / Tarrega
 Symphony No. 2 in D Major, Op. 43, IV: Finale / Sibelius
 Carnival Of The Animals, XII: The Swan / Saint-Saëns
 Symphony No. 3 in F Major, Op. 90, III: Poco allegretto (3rd Movement) / Brahms
 Sicilianna / Louis Clark

 Viva Vivaldi - 3:59

 Concerto In C Major for Many Instruments, RV 558 (F. XII, No. 37), I: Allegro molto 
 Violin Concerto in D major, Op. 7 No. 11 RV 208a (F. XII, No. 14) I: Allegro
 Concerto In G Major for Two Mandolins, RV 532 ( F. V, No. 2), I: Allegro
 Concerto In C Major for Many Instruments, RV 558 (F. XII, No. 37), I: Allegro molto
 Concerto In C Major for Many Instruments, RV 558 (F. XII, No. 37), III: Allegro
 Concerto In C Major for Many Instruments, RV 558 (F. XII, No. 37), I: Allegro molto
 Concerto In A Minor for Two Oboes and Strings, RV 536 (F. VII, No. 8), I: Allegro  
 Concerto In C Major for Many Instruments, RV 558 (F. XII, No. 37), I: Allegro molto  

 Dance Of The Furies - 3:28

 Orfeo ed Euridice, Act 2, No. 28: Dance Of The Furies / Gluck
 The Four Seasons, Op. 8- Concerto No. 2 in G Minor, RV 315, “Summer”, III: Presto / Vivaldi

 Scotland The Brave (Hookery Jiggery Jock) - 3:50

 Scotland the Brave
 Ben Glen Bay
 Cock O' The North
 Wi' A Hundred Pipers
 Charlie Is My Darling
 Loch Lomond
 The Keel Row
 Bonnie Dundee
 Roxburgh Castle
 Amazing Grace

 Journey Through The Classics (Part 2) - 3:55

 The Snow Maiden Suite, IV: Dance of the Tumblers / Rimsky-Korsakov
 The Bartered Bride, Act 3, No. 3: Dance Of The Comedians  / Smetana
  Karelia Suite, Op. 11, III: Alla marcia / Sibelius
 String Quartet in D Major, Op. 64, No. 5, "The Lark", IV: Finale / Haydn
 Symphony No. 6 in B Minor, Op. 74 “Pathetique”, III: Allegro molto vivace / Tchaikovsky
 The Barber Of Seville, Act 1, "Largo Al Factotum"/ Rossini
 The Merry Wives Of Windsor Overture / Nicolai

 Journey Through America - 3:22

 The Star-Spangled Banner / Stafford Smith
 Oh Susanna / Foster
 Marching Through Georgia / Work
 The Yellow Rose Of Texas / Traditional
 When The Saints Go Marching In / Traditional
 Blue Tail Fly / Traditional
 When Johnny Comes Marching Home / Traditional
 Deep in the Heart of Texas /Swander, Herschey
 Yankee Doodle / Traditional
 Caissons Go Rolling Along / Traditional
 Shortnin' Bread / Traditional
 The Star-Spangled Banner (Reprise)/ Stafford Smith

 Hooked On Marching - 3:10

 Under the Double Eagle / J. F. Wagner
 The Stars And Stripes Forever / Sousa
 Under The Double Eagle / J. F. Wagner
 The British Grenadiers / Traditional
 Cavalry Of The Clouds / Alford
 Officer of the Day / Hall
 King Cotton / Sousa
 Imperial Echoes / Safroni

 Symphony Of The Seas - 2:47

 The Sailor's Hornpipe / Traditional
 Portsmouth / Traditional
 Anchors Aweigh / Zimmermann
 A Life On The Ocean Waves / Traditional
 What Shall We Do With The Drunken Sailor / Traditional
 Blow The Man Down / Traditional
 The Sailor's Hornpipe / Traditional

 Hooked On Rodgers & Hammerstein - 3:37

 Oklahoma Theme    
 June Is Bustin' Out All Over (From "Carousel")    
 There Is Nothin' Like A Dame (From "South Pacific")    
 The Farmer And The Cowman (From "Oklahoma")    
 Do-Re-Mi (From "The Sound Of Music")    
 Oklahoma Theme (Reprise)

References

1983 albums
Royal Philharmonic Orchestra albums
RCA Records albums
Hooked on Classics albums